Shustov (Шустов) is a brand of Russian vodka.

History

Sources

 OST-Alco @ РОСПРОДМАШСЕРВИС

External links 
 Shustov Cognac History @ Pinterest
 Shustov Vodka, TV ad @ YouTube
 Review @ Wine Enthusiast

Russian vodkas
Russian brands
Products introduced in 1998